Michi Madness (stylized as MiChi MadNesS) is the first album released by British-Japanese musician MiChi, released on 27 June 2008. It was released on Mmm Records, an independent record label. The album includes four cover songs originally by The Spice Girls, Queen, Des'ree, and Fergie. "Surrender" was featured on a dance compilation album titled Freedom-House Mode Collection. The album peaked at number 142 on the Japanese Oricon charts and had a chart run of six weeks.

Track listing
 Fuck You And Your Money
 We Will Rock You (Originally by Queen)
 London Bridge (Originally by Fergie)
 Spread Your Wings
 Wannabe (Originally by The Spice Girls)
 Real
 Madness Vol.2
 Surrender
 You Gotta Be (Originally by Des'ree)
 Spread Your Wings (Remix)
 Madness Vol.2 (D.O.I Remix)

References

2008 debut albums